Kenmore may refer to:

Places

Australia
 Kenmore, Queensland, a suburb of Brisbane, Queensland
 Kenmore Asylum, a decommissioned psychiatric hospital located in Goulburn, New South Wales
 Kenmore Bypass, a proposed major road in Brisbane
 Kenmore Hills, Queensland, a suburb of Brisbane
 Kenmore House, Rockhampton, a heritage-listed house in Queensland
 Kenmore railway station, a former railway station on the Crookwell railway line, New South Wales, which served Kenmore Asylum
 Kenmore State High School, Brisbane

United States
 Fenway–Kenmore, in Boston, Massachusetts
 Kenmore (MBTA station), in Boston, Massachusetts
 Kenmore (Richmond, Massachusetts), listed on the NRHP in Massachusetts
 Kenmore Square, in Boston, Massachusetts
 Kenmore station (GCRTA), Cleveland, Ohio
 Kenmore, New York, a village in Erie County, New York
 Kenmore (RTA Rapid Transit station), in Shaker Heights, Ohio
 Kenmore, Akron, Ohio
 Kenmore Plantation (home of Fielding and Betty Washington Lewis), in Fredericksburg, Virginia, listed on the NRHP in Virginia
 Kenmore (Spotsylvania County, Virginia), a heritage-listed house
 Kenmore (Spotsylvania, Virginia), listed on the NRHP in Virginia
 Kenmore, Washington
 Kenmore Air Harbor, a seaplane base
 Kenmore Air Harbor Seaplane Base, Seattle
 Kenmore Farm, a historic farm and educational property just outside Amherst, Virginia
 Kenmore High School, a former public high school in Akron, Ohio
 Kenmore Hotel, a historic building in the city of Albany, New York

Other places
 Kenmore, Ontario, Canada
 Kenmore, Perth and Kinross, Scotland

People
 Peter E. Kenmore (active 1994), American agricultural entomologist
 Kenmore Hughes (born 1970), retired sprinter from Antigua and Barbuda

Other
 Kenmore (brand), a brand name of household appliances sold in stores owned by Sears Holdings Corporation
 Kenmore Air, an American airline
 Kenmore Australian Football Club or Kenmore Bears, Chelmer, Queensland
 USS Kenmore, several ships

See also
 Hotel Kenmore Hall, 22-floor single room occupancy hotel in the Gramercy section of Manhattan, New York, U.S.
 Clair Kenamore (c. 1875–1935), American newspaper journalist
 Kenmore House (disambiguation)
 Kenmoor (disambiguation)
 Ken More (1907–1993), Canadian politician